Erica Jarrell is an American rugby union player. She plays Prop for Beantown RFC and the United States.

Jarrell was named in an Eagles Under-20 side that competed in a Women’s Under-20 Tri-Nations Cup against Canada and England in 2019. She featured in both games at Lock.

Jarrell graduated from Harvard in 2021, she was a co-captain of the women’s rugby team. In 2022, She was selected in the Eagles squad for the postponed 2021 Rugby World Cup in New Zealand, she is currently uncapped and is yet to make her international debut.

Jarrell is a 2017 graduate of Buckingham Browne & Nichols School.

References 

Living people
Female rugby union players
American female rugby union players
Harvard Crimson rugby players
Buckingham Browne & Nichols School alumni
1999 births